Kõnnu is a village in Saaremaa Parish, Saare County, Estonia, on the island of Saaremaa. In 2011, the settlement's population was 41.

References

Villages in Saare County